The longest serving president of a United States institution of higher education is Eliphalet Nott, who served at Union College in Schenectady, New York, for 62 years (1805–66).

Criteria
According to a 2007 report from the American Council on Education, only about 5% of all in-office college presidents had served longer than 20 years. The table below considers candidates who can be demonstrated to have served for 30 years or longer unless another distinguishing factor warrants inclusion. Records for the longest-serving college or university presidents are usually kept by the respective institutions themselves.

List

See also

Academic Administration
Chancellor (education)
Higher education in the United States
List of leaders of universities and colleges in the United States

Notes

References

 Longest
Higher education in the United States
University governance
United States
United States presidents